is a town located in Kitauwa District, Ehime Prefecture, Japan. , the town had an estimated population of 9,614 in 4891 households, and a population density of 40 persons per km². The total area of the town is .The name of the town is derived from the town's location to the north, 北, of Mt. Onigajō "鬼が城."

Geography
Kihoku is located in the Onigajō mountain range in southwestern Ehime Prefecture on the island of Shikoku. The town is composed of several villages merged into one town area. As such, it is spread out over a broad series of small valleys in the town proper. The largest town area, Hiromi, is located in a larger valley in the southwest section of the town. Other areas include Aiji in the north, Mishima centrally, and Hiyoshi in the east.

Climate
Matsuno has a humid subtropical climate (Köppen Cfa) characterized by warm summers and cool winters with light snowfall.  The average annual temperature in Matsuno is 14.5 °C. The average annual rainfall is 2010 mm with September as the wettest month. The temperatures are highest on average in January, at around 25.3 °C, and lowest in January, at around 3.5 °C. Because of the higher elevation and surrounding mountains, Kihoku is generally cooler than Uwajima and Matsuyama, though at times it can be warmer. The area of Hiyoshi is higher in the mountains than Hiromi, and thus cooler. Snow falls occasionally in the winter, but rarely lasts in the town for more than a few days. Summers are hot and humid, with the rainy season lasting from mid-June to mid-July.

Nearby cities and towns
Ehime Prefecture
Seiyo to the north
Uwajima to the east
Matsuno to the south
Kōchi Prefecture
Shimanto town to the south
Yusuhara to the west

Mountains
Mt. Takatsuki  1,228 m
Mt. Kakkōdake  1,010 m
Mt. Izumigamori  755 m
Mt. Tokigozen    946 m
Mt. Gozaisho     908 m

Rivers
There are numerous rivers running through the area, the largest of which is the Hiromi River, which is a tributary of the Shimanto River, in Kōchi Prefecture.

Demographics
Per Japanese census data, the population of Kihoku has been decreased steadily since the 1950s.

History 
The area of Kihoku was part of ancient Iyo Province. During the Edo period, the area was part of the holdings of Uwajima Domain ruled by the Date clan from their seat at Uwajima Castle. The villages of Yoshida and Asahi (旭村) were established with the creation of the modern municipalities system on October 1, 1889. Asahi was raised to town status on November 10, 19941 and was renamed Chikanaga (近永町). Chikanaga merged with the neighboring villages of Yoshifuji, Aiji, Izumi and Mishima to form the town of Hiromi (広見町) on March 31, 1955. On January 1, 2005 Hiromi and Yoshida merged to form the town of Kihoku.

Government
Kihoku has a mayor-council form of government with a directly elected mayor and a unicameral town council of 12 members. Kihoku, together with Uwajima and Matsuno, contributes four members to the Ehime Prefectural Assembly. In terms of national politics, the town is part of Ehime 4th district of the lower house of the Diet of Japan.

Economy
Forestry and agriculture are the main industries in Kihoku; however, forestry is in decline. Agriculture is dominated by rice cultivation. Additional products include Shiitake mushrooms, chestnuts, yuzu, chickens, bancha tea, wasabi, melons, strawberries, Japanese yams, cucumbers, turmeric, milk, miso, trout, fish products, crabs, wood products and pottery.

Kihoku residents are especially proud of their pheasant meat, which is a town delicacy. In addition to pheasant meat, pheasant sake is also produced. One of the main highlights of the Dechikonka festival is the massive pheasant nabemono, or pheasant stew, which is made for the festival and given away.

Education
Kihoku has six public elementary schools and two public middle schools operated by the town government. The town has two public high schools operated by the Ehime Prefectural Board of Education.

Transportation

Railways 
 Shikoku Railway Company - Yodo Line
  -  -

Highways

Local attractions
Jōmon Ruins — The remains of a 3,000-year-old Jōmon Period community are located near the eastern section of the Hiromi River. The ruins are composed of a small formation of stones, which are protected by an enclosure and have been designated as a historical site.
Narukawa Valley — A valley in the southwestern part of the town popular for its beautiful nature. The area offers a multitude of activities, including camping, fishing and hiking. In summer there is a sōmen noodle shop. There is also a scenic lodge that serves pheasant dishes, and an onsen.
Morinosankakuboshi — A farmer's market in Hiromi where locally grown rice and vegetables can be purchased. In the shops adjacent to the market a wide variety of local products such as miso paste and boar curry are also sold.
Yumesanchi — A farmer's market in Hiyoshi where locally grown rice and vegetables can be purchased. There is a large shop nearby that sells local souvenirs and food products.
Yasumoridō Sōmennagashi —"Yasumori River Sōmen Restaurant" operates from the middle of July to the end of August each summer. The primary attraction here is the nagashi sōmen restaurant, where clumps of sōmen are sent flowing down a metal trough for customers to pluck out with their chopsticks. The noodles are then dipped in a sauce seasoned with yuzu, green onions, sesame, and other ingredients. Also at the restaurant are the Yasumorishōnyu Cave, a small cave which is very cool even during the hottest time of the year, and a small pond stocked with numerous trout for fishing.

Events
Dechikonka — The town's main annual festival. In the town's old dialect it means "Won't you come out?" The festival usually takes place on the third weekend of October, starting off with taiko performances Saturday evening. On Sunday there are various dance and musical performances on a bandstand by local groups, as well as a performance by a nationally-known singer or entertainer. As in most Japanese festivals there are also numerous vendors and stalls selling a variety of food and other products.
Kawanobori Ekiden — "River-climbing Relay," an annual event at the beginning of August where teams of runners race up the Hiromi River. Although running in the shallows is permitted, runners must land in the water with every step, making the race very slippery and difficult. There is also a "tetsujin," "iron-man," race for individual participants.

Notable people from Kihoku
Tadashi Hyōdō, one of the first female pilots in Japan, and the first Japanese woman to attain a pilot's license.

References

External links

Kihoku official website 

Towns in Ehime Prefecture
Kihoku, Ehime